Owen O'Donnell is an Australian former rugby league footballer who played in the 1970s. He played in the NSWRFL premiership for North Sydney, South Sydney and the St. George Dragons.

Playing career
O'Donnell made his first grade debut for North Sydney in 1970.  He finished the season as the club's top point scorer and was selected to play for New South Wales in the interstate series against Queensland.  In his 4 years at the club, O'Donnell played 60 games but the club never qualified for the finals in his time there.

In 1974, O'Donnell signed for South Sydney and played finals football for the first time that year as Souths finished 4th on the table.  Souths were eliminated in the first week against Western Suburbs with O'Donnell playing at centre.  In his second year at the club, Souths finished last on the table and claimed the wooden spoon.

In 1976, O'Donnell moved to St George and played one season for the club.  St George finished 3rd that year and qualified for the finals.  O'Donnell played on the wing in St George's 31–6 loss against Parramatta.  This would be O'Donnell's last game in first grade and he retired at the end of the year.

References

North Sydney Bears players
South Sydney Rabbitohs players
St. George Dragons players
Rugby league centres
1950 births
Rugby league players from Sydney
New South Wales rugby league team players
Living people